Ibirubá is a municipality in the state of Rio Grande do Sul, Brazil.  As of 2020, the estimated population was 20,413.

See also
List of municipalities in Rio Grande do Sul

É um munícipio que fica no estado do Rio Grande do Sul.

References

Municipalities in Rio Grande do Sul